Estabrook House in Syracuse, New York was built in 1909.  Along with other Ward Wellington Ward-designed homes in Syracuse, it was listed on the National Register of Historic Places in 1997.  The home's design includes a gambrel roof and a jettied second story.

It is located at 819 Comstock Ave. in Syracuse.

The Charles Estabrook Mansion is another Ward home, in Fayetteville outside Syracuse.

See also
List of Registered Historic Places in Onondaga County, New York

References

Houses in Syracuse, New York
National Register of Historic Places in Syracuse, New York
Houses on the National Register of Historic Places in New York (state)
Bungalow architecture in New York (state)
American Craftsman architecture in New York (state)
Houses completed in 1909